Sodium/potassium transporting ATPase interacting 1 is a protein that in humans is encoded by the NKAIN1 gene.

Function

NKAIN1 is a member of a family of mammalian proteins with similarity to Drosophila Nkain and interacts with the beta subunit of Na,K-ATPase (ATP1B1; MIM 182330) (Gorokhova et al., 2007 [PubMed 17606467]).[supplied by OMIM, Jun 2009].

References

Further reading